is a Japanese diver who competed in the 1936 Summer Olympics.

In 1936 she finished sixth in the 10 metre platform event and eighth in the 3 metre springboard competition.

External links

 

1916 births
Possibly living people
Japanese female divers
Olympic divers of Japan
Divers at the 1936 Summer Olympics
20th-century Japanese women